Gary Christenson is the mayor of Malden, Massachusetts.

Education
Gary Christenson is a triple alumnus of Suffolk University. He has received a bachelor's degree in political science and business management in 1990 and a master's degree in public administration in 1992. In 2003, Gary received his Juris Doctor from the Suffolk University Law School.

Political career
Gary's political career began with working for the Massachusetts House Ways and Means committee from 1994-1997. Reporting to Tom Finneran, he was a budget analyst, revenue director, and special assistant. He then worked at the Middlesex County Sheriff's Office where he assumed the role of budget director from 1998 to 2011. He managed a $60 million annual budget during his tenure. He also worked with other Sheriff's Office managers to ensure the efficient operation of the Middlesex Jail in Cambridge and Middlesex House of Correction in Billerica. He achieved national acclaim in Spring 2019 for his habit of picking up trash every day while walking to the office.

School Committee

Gary Christenson was appointed to the Malden School Committee by then-Mayor Richard Howard, the man he would eventually replace as Mayor of Malden.

Gary was encouraged to join the school committee by his mentor, James DiPaola, a Malden resident, and former head of the Middlesex County Sheriff's Department, where Gary had worked for him.

City Council
Gary Christenson served as a city councillor of Ward 1 in Malden for seven years after taking office in January 2004. In 2006, he was elevated to Chairman of the Finance Committee and in 2008 he was voted unanimously by his peers as City Council President.

Mayor
Gary Christenson was elected mayor of Malden in 2011 and took office on January 2, 2012.

References

Living people
Mayors of Malden, Massachusetts
Suffolk University Law School alumni
Massachusetts Democrats
Year of birth missing (living people)